Andi Ramang (April 24, 1924 – September 26, 1987) was an Indonesian footballer.  He is widely considered by Indonesian football experts and former players as one of the greatest players in the history of Indonesian football. He is particularly known for his bicycle kicks and ability to score goals from right corner kicks. He was also referred to as Rusli Ramang in official FIFA documents.

Early life 
Ramang was born in 1928 in Barru, South Sulawesi. His father, Nyo'lo, was an aide of the King of Gowa, Djondjong Karenta Lemamparang, and was known for his ability in sepak takraw. Ramang spent his childhood playing sepak takraw using balls made out of rattan, cloth, and sometimes orange fruits. This is believed to be the reason why Ramang frequently score goals using bicycle kicks.

Club career and other jobs 
Ramang started his career as a football player in 1939 by joining a football club in Barru. He played until 1943, when he decided to end his bachelorhood. Together with his wife, they opened a small coffee shop for a living. After the death of their newborn baby, they decided to leave for Ujungpandang (now Makassar) just before Indonesia's independence. They stayed at a friend's house, and Ramang started his life there as a becak driver, later becoming a truck driver assistant. During this time, his wife gave birth to their second child.

In 1947, Ramang was contracted by PSM Makassar, after seeing his performance in a competition held by PSM. His team, Persis (Persatuan Sepakbola Seluruh Sulawesi), won 9–0 in one of the matches, and only two names are on the scoreboard, one of them being Ramang, scoring 7 goals. He only spent a year in PSM, later worked in a Public Works Department, with a salary of 3500 rupiahs (equal to 4 US cents).

International career 
In 1952, Ramang replaced Sunardi, Suardi Arland's brother – both of them football players – to join a training camp in Djakarta. This led to his call-up to the Indonesia national football team. During the All-Indonesia tour of the Far East in 1953, Indonesia played against the Philippines in their country, All-Hong Kong, Hong Kong Selection, Combined Chinese and South Korea in Hong Kong, and the Thai Royal Air Force in Bangkok, Thailand. Indonesia only lost once to South Korea and winning all the other games. They only conceded 7 goals and scored 25 goals, of which 19 of them are scored by Ramang.

Ramang was also called up by coach Antun Pogačnik to be the part of the 1956 Summer Olympics team in Melbourne. Indonesia automatically qualified to the quarterfinals after South Vietnam withdrew. They successfully held the Soviet Union 0–0, who at the time was considered to be one of the strongest teams in the world. In the replay match Indonesia lost 0–4 to USSR, but the first game was considered as one of the famous matches in the Indonesian football history.

Ramang, who wore shirt number 9 in the tournament stated in an interview with Tempo about the match: "Actually I was about to score a goal that time. But my shirt was being pulled from behind." It was the first time, also the only one so far for the Indonesian football team to participate in the Summer Olympics.

One of Ramang's famous goals was against China PR in the 1958 FIFA World Cup qualification, where Indonesia won 2–0, and one of the goals was done by bicycle kick.

Ramang gained nationwide popularity during his international career, including in the late 50s where many Indonesian mothers named their babies "Ramang."

|}

Honours

Club 
Persis
 Perserikatan: 1942, 1943

PSM Makassar
 Perserikatan: 1955–57, 1957–59, 1964–65, 1965–66

International 
 Asian Games  Bronze medal : 1958

Individual 
 IFFHS Men’s All Time Indonesia Dream Team: 2022

Later life and death 
Ramang was suspended from football in 1960 after he was accused of accepting bribes, which he denied until his death. In 1962 he was called up again by PSM Makassar, but finally decided to retire from football in 1968, at the age of 44. He then decided to become a coach for PSM Makassar, then other football clubs, PSBI Blitar and Persipal Palu, and later returned to coach PSM Makassar.

One night in 1981, Ramang returned home with wet clothes after coaching PSM Makassar players under the rain. Since then he became sick and was diagnosed with pneumonia. Ramang stayed at home for six years because he had no money to pay for hospital care. Ramang died in Ujungpandang, on September 26, 1987, at the age of 63, and was survived by his 4 children and 10 grandchildren.

Legacy 
Minister of Youths and Sport Andi Mallarangeng said that Ramang was "an inspiration to Makassarese children who love football". Ramang's life story also was made to biographical book written by M. Dahlan Abu Bakar entitled Ramang, Macan Bola, released in August 2011. Harry Tjong, Ramang's partner in national team said that Ramang is worth called "the special one" such as Mourinho, and also he was like Maradona.

References

External links 
 

Indonesian footballers
1928 births
1987 deaths
Sportspeople from Makassar
Indonesia international footballers
Asian Games medalists in football
Footballers at the 1954 Asian Games
Footballers at the 1958 Asian Games
Olympic footballers of Indonesia
Footballers at the 1956 Summer Olympics
Indonesian football managers
Asian Games bronze medalists for Indonesia
Association football forwards
Medalists at the 1958 Asian Games